is a town located in Tsukubo District, Okayama Prefecture, Japan.

As of June 1, 2020, the town has a population of 12,671 and a density of 1,700 persons per km². This is the highest population density of any municipality in Okayama Prefecture. The total area is 7.62 km², making it also the smallest municipality.

References

External links

 Town of Hayashima 

Towns in Okayama Prefecture